The Luzon montane mabouya (Eutropis bontocensis) is a species of skink found in Luzon in the Philippines.

References

Eutropis
Reptiles described in 1923
Reptiles of the Philippines
Endemic fauna of the Philippines
Taxa named by Edward Harrison Taylor